Diego Nicolás Villar (born 24 April 1981) is an Argentine football manager and former player who played as a winger. He is the current interim manager of Aldosivi.

Career

Villar started his professional playing career with Newell's Old Boys in 2001, in 2005 he joined Chilean side Santiago Wanderers but returned to Argentina later that year to join 2nd division team Godoy Cruz. In 2006, he was part of the Godoy Cruz team to win promotion to the Argentine Primera. Despite his contribution of 7 goals Godoy Cruz were relegated at the end of the 2006-2007 season after losing their playoff with Huracán.

In 2007 Villar joined Arsenal de Sarandí, but was allowed to leave in February 2008 to join Gimnasia de La Plata. He returned to Godoy Cruz for the 2010–11 Argentine Primera División season.

In July 2012 he is transferred to Racing Club signing a 3-year contract. He was a key figure in the team that won the 2014 First Division championship.

In 2017, Following three seasons playing for Defensa y Justicia and Uniòn de Santa Fe, Villar signed for his home-town club Aldosivi. He retired in 2018, after Aldosivi's promotion to Primera Divisiòn.

Personal life
As of 2020 he owned a sweets & confectionery company in his native city of Mar del Plata.

Honours
Arsenal de Sarandí
Copa Sudamericana: 2007

Racing Club
Argentine Primera División: 2014

References

External links
 Argentine Primera statistics
 Football-Lineups player profile
 

1981 births
Living people
Sportspeople from Mar del Plata
Argentine footballers
Association football wingers
Newell's Old Boys footballers
Godoy Cruz Antonio Tomba footballers
Arsenal de Sarandí footballers
Club de Gimnasia y Esgrima La Plata footballers
Racing Club de Avellaneda footballers
Unión de Santa Fe footballers
Argentine Primera División players
Argentine expatriate footballers
Expatriate footballers in Chile
Argentine football managers
Aldosivi managers